Dashu may refer to:

Dashu (solar term) (大暑), the 12th solar term of the traditional Chinese lunisolar calendar 
Dashu District (大樹區), a district of Kaohsiung, Taiwan

Townships in China
Dashu Township, Gansu (大树乡), in Dongxiang Autonomous County, Gansu
Dashu Township, Jiangxi (大树乡), in Duchang County, Jiangxi

Towns in China
Dashu, Anhui (大墅), in Quanjiao County, Anhui
Dashu, Chongqing (大树), in Fengjie County, Chongqing
Dashu, Shandong (大束), in Zoucheng, Shandong
Dashu, Dazhou (大树), in Dazhou, Sichuan
Dashu, Hanyuan County (大树), in Hanyuan County, Sichuan
Dashu, Zhejiang (大墅), in Chun'an County, Zhejiang

See also
Shu (disambiguation) for a list of states in Chinese history called "Da Shu" or "Great Shu"